Edman Ayvazyan (– ) was an Iranian-Armenian painter. He was the first Iranian artist to join Royal Institute of Oil Painters.

Biography 
Edman Ayvazyan was born in Tehran, Iran, in 1932.

Ayvazyan depicted Daredevils of Sassoun, the works of Hovhannes Tumanyan, and created many portraits, landscapes, and seascapes. His works can be found in many churches and museums including the Lazar Gallery, House-Museum of Aram Khachaturian, and in 1982 contributed a major work for the Royal Mosque of King Khalid International Airport, in the form of a band of marble mosaic of Arabic calligraphy around its central dome.

Ayvazyan died on 25 March 2020 in London, England, due to COVID-19 (during the 2019–20 coronavirus pandemic).

Exhibitions 
From 1950 to 1990 Ayvazyan participated in group and solo exhibitions in Iran, Armenia, the UK and the United States.

 Artists' Union of Armenia, Yerevan, 1987
 Ararat club, Tehran
 "Colors of homeland", Yerevan, National Gallery of Armenia, 2015

Awards 
 Arshil Gorki medal of Armenia Ministry of Diaspora, 2015.

References

External links 

1932 births
2020 deaths
Armenian painters
Iranian painters
Iranian people of Armenian descent
People from Tehran
Artists from London
Deaths from the COVID-19 pandemic in England
Members of the Royal Institute of Oil Painters